Ricardo Bermejo (1900 – 17 August 1957) was a Chilean cyclist. He competed in two events at the 1924 Summer Olympics.

References

External links
 

1900 births
1957 deaths
Chilean male cyclists
Olympic cyclists of Chile
Cyclists at the 1924 Summer Olympics
Place of birth missing
20th-century Chilean people